The 2012–13 Florida Gators men's basketball team represented the University of Florida in the sport of basketball during the 2012–13 college basketball season.  The Gators competed in Division I of the National Collegiate Athletic Association (NCAA) and the Southeastern Conference (SEC).  They were led by head coach Billy Donovan, and played their home games in the O'Connell Center on the university's Gainesville, Florida campus.

The Gators finished the SEC regular season with a 14–4 conference record, earning their sixth SEC regular season championship. As a No. 3 seed in the 2013 NCAA Division I men's basketball tournament, the Gators advanced to the Elite Eight for the third consecutive year where they were defeated by Michigan.

Previous season

The Gators finished the 2011–12 season with a record of 26–11 overall, a 10–6 record in SEC play and lost in the Elite Eight round of the NCAA tournament to Louisville. Freshman shooting guard Bradley Beal, who finished second on the team in scoring average, decided to forgo his sophomore season and enter the 2012 NBA draft. He was selected by the Washington Wizards with the third overall pick.

Roster

Coaches

NOTES:
Rashon Burno was hired as an assistant coach on April 12, 2012. The position became available after Norm Roberts resigned to become an assistant coach at Kansas.

Team statistics 
As of March 31, 2013. 
 Indicates team leader in specific category.
Retrieved from Gatorzone.com

Schedule and results

|-
!colspan=6 style="background:#0021A5; color:#FFFFFF;"| Exhibition

|-
!colspan=6 style="background:#0021A5; color:#FFFFFF;"| Non-conference regular season

|-
!colspan=6 style="background:#0021A5; color:#FFFFFF;"| SEC regular season

|-
!colspan=6 style="background:#0021A5; color:#FFFFFF;"| SEC Tournament

|-
!colspan=6 style="background:#0021A5; color:#FFFFFF;"| NCAA tournament

NOTES:
Game played aboard the USS Bataan at Naval Station Mayport in Jacksonville, Florida.

The game was suspended due to condensation on the court at halftime with the Gators leading 27–23.  It was not made up.

Rankings

Awards and honors 

 Michael Frazier II
 SEC Freshman of the Week (11/26/12–12/3/12). Frazier scored 17 points while shooting 5-for-8 from three-point range in a win over Marquette.
 SEC Freshman of the Week (2/11/13–2/18/13). Frazier scored 18 points while shooting 6-for-7 from three-point range in a road victory over Auburn. 
 Scottie Wilbekin
 SEC Player of the Week (1/21/13–1/28/13). Wilbekin averaged 15 points and 6 assists in two wins over Georgia and Mississippi State.

References

Florida
Florida Gators men's basketball seasons
Florida
Florida Gators men's basketball team
Florida Gators men's basketball team